A number of Wurlitzer theatre organs were imported and installed in the United Kingdom in the period from 1925 to just before the Second World War (1939–45).

The first Wurlitzer theatre organ shipped to the UK was dispatched on 1 December 1924, and shipped in via Southampton Docks. A very small, six-rank instrument, it was installed at the Picture House, Walsall, Staffordshire, where it opened on 26 January 1925. After a period in private ownership in Sedgley, also in Staffordshire, during the mid-1950s, it is now installed and operational in the Congregational Church in Beer, Devon.  More details about the Beer Wurlitzer along with photos can be found on the website http://theatreorgans.com/beerwurly/ .

The second Wurlitzer theatre organ to be opened in Great Britain was at the Palace Cinema in Tottenham, North London. This instrument was inaugurated on 6 April 1925. Like the Beer Wurlitzer it was a 2-manual, 6-rank instrument. This organ is now located at Rye College in East Sussex.

The Trocadero Elephant and Castle Wurlitzer was the largest organ ever shipped to the UK, installed in 1930 for the grand opening of the 3,400-seater cinema.

The Blackpool Opera House organ of 1939, designed by Horace Finch, was the last new Wurlitzer to be installed in the UK. The Granada, Kingston also received a Wurlitzer in or around 1939, but most of this came from an earlier installation in Edinburgh. This was the last Wurlitzer installation to be opened, with Reginald Dixon at the console.

Wurlitzers made regular radio broadcasts via the BBC, becoming stars themselves beside their organists. The more famous of these organs were at the Empire Cinema, London, and the Tower Ballroom, Blackpool, the latterly most regularly played by Reginald Dixon creating what became known as the "Blackpool sound".

Many Wurlitzer organs have survived and are installed in private homes, town halls, concert halls and ballrooms throughout the country. The Cinema Organ Society has an extensive list of British cinema organs.

List of Wurlitzers in the United Kingdom

See also
 Wurlitzer
 Theatre organ

References

British music-related lists
United Kingdom